is a Japanese weekly magazine that contains celebrity gossip, politics, news, and simply. It is published by Kodansha. New issues are released every friday, hence the name.

History
Friday, often called , was launched on 9 November 1984. The magazine is best known for its candid, paparazzi-style photographs of celebrities and politicians, accompanied by often scandalous rumors of their private lives. It has been compared to as a mix of the magazines People and Newsweek. A special supplementary issue called Friday Dynamite is published several times a year.

Friday usually covers stories too risqué for the daily newspapers. Their covers usually depict either female celebrities or scantily clad models.

In 2003, the magazine published its 1,000th issue – a double issue covering both the Golden Week and the Bon Festival/Christmas and holiday season.

Friday is one of three Japanese weekly magazines, along with Flash, also published by Kobunsha, and Focus, published by Shinchosha, that are collectively known as the "3F". In the early 1990s, following the rapid rise of the 3F, other major publishers began issuing their own tabloid-style magazines. In addition to the appearance of Emma (Bungeishunjū) and Touch (Shogakukan), the "3F" became the "3FET"; however, Emma and Touch were not able to compete with Flash and Friday. Both were shut down by the end of the decade. After Focus was discontinued in 2001, Friday became the most widely circulated weekly magazine. It has 409,082 subscribers according to the Japan Magazine Society. At its peak in the mid-1990s, Friday was selling roughly 600,000 issues per week.

Editors
※ Source: Kodansha no 100-nen (company history)

Controversies
 In December 1986, Friday published an article alleging that the TV personality Takeshi Kitano was having an affair with a college student. Kitano was furious and felt that he and his family had been harassed by the magazine. He and a group of followers attacked the Friday offices in retaliation. The men involved were charged and received suspended sentences. During the trials, the information and sources that the magazine used were criticized. Thus, this incident directly caused a decline in the magazine's circulation.
 In September 1991, Happy Science protested the content of an article. This caused widespread demonstrations and calls for legal action. A feature article posted later in the 1,000th issue said, "the work of Kodansha was temporarily stopped due to this one case."
 According to a report in May 2000, Prime Minister Yoshirō Mori offered a delicate English greeting to the President of United States, Bill Clinton. This was reported on 21 July, in the 2000th issue of Friday relating to 26th G8 summit and Shūkan Bunshun. In addition, journalist Shūkan Asahi is skeptical of the report of Friday and verified the articles, exposing that the articles were created by Akio Takahata, editorial writer of Mainichi Newspapers.
 In October 2006, the magazine published a Scenic Kiss Photo in Minamiaoyama, Minato, Tokyo with Democratic Party of Japan member Goshi Hosono and freelance announcer Mona Yamamoto at the top of the spread page. Because Hosono was in a relationship, the affair triggered a scandal, leading to his resignation in October of that year. As a representative on behalf of the Democratic policy investigation, Chairman Yamamoto stopped making appearances on Tetsuya Chikushi, News23 from 2 October on the grounds of "poor physical conditions", and left on 23 October. This photo was awarded the 2006 "Editors' Choice Magazine Journalism Award Topic Award."
 In August 2011, Friday published an exposé of TV personality Shinsuke Shimada and his ties to Yakuza. Shimada admitted exchanging text messages with the leader of an Osaka-based gang affiliated with Yamaguchi-gumi and was forced to resign as a result. He later sued Kodansha for compensation in the amount of 55 million yen, stating that his honor and reputation had been irreparably damaged by allegations. The Tokyo District Court ordered Kodansha to pay 3.3 million yen and rejected Shimada's demand to have the magazine apologize.
 In the 23 June 2017, issue, an article alleged that actor Keisuke Koide had been drinking with and had sex with a female minor. Koide admitted to the crimes and was subsequently suspended by his talent agency. Prosecutors indicted him on the charge of drinking but dropped the charge of statutory rape against Koide, as the minor-in-question desired an out-of-court settlement.

Issue circulation

References

External links
 – Publisher of FRIDAY 
 – Web media 
 – Web media 
 – A subscription service of FRIDAY, mainly focusing on photos of models 

Weekly magazines published in Japan
Kodansha magazines
Magazines established in 1984
Magazines published in Tokyo